Alex Yuwan Tjong (born 1 March 1991) is a Brazilian male badminton player. He started playing badminton in his hometown in 1997 at age six because his father took him and his brothers to play badminton on a weekend. In 2004, at age 13, he selected to join the Brazil national badminton team. In 2015, at age 24, he competed at the Pan American Games and won a bronze in the mixed doubles event partnered with Lohaynny Vicente.

Achievements

Pan American Games
Mixed Doubles

Pan American Championships
Men's Singles

Men's Doubles

South American Games
Men's Doubles

Mixed Doubles

BWF International Challenge/Series
Men's Doubles

Mixed Doubles

 BWF International Challenge tournament
 BWF International Series tournament
 BWF Future Series tournament

References

External links 
 
 Confederação Brasileira de Badminton Atleta

Living people
1991 births
Sportspeople from Campinas
Brazilian male badminton players
Brazilian sportspeople of Chinese descent
Brazilian people of Indonesian descent
Sportspeople of Indonesian descent
Indonesian people of Chinese descent
Badminton players at the 2015 Pan American Games
Badminton players at the 2011 Pan American Games
South American Games silver medalists for Brazil
South American Games medalists in badminton
Competitors at the 2010 South American Games
Pan American Games medalists in badminton
Pan American Games bronze medalists for Brazil
Medalists at the 2015 Pan American Games
20th-century Brazilian people
21st-century Brazilian people